Mandala is an album by Kitarō, released in 1994. This is his first studio album for Domo Records. It was nominated for a Grammy Award in 1994 for Best New Age Album.

Track listing

Charts

References

External links
Kitaro official web site 
Kitaro official web site 
Kitaro TV - Kitaro's official YouTube page
Kitaro Facebook page

1994 albums
Kitarō albums